Andrevaldo de Jesus Santos (born 10 February 1992), commonly known as Valdo, is a Brazilian professional footballer as a centre back who plays for V-Varen Nagasaki from 2023.

Club career
Born in Aracaju, Valdo graduated from the youth setup of Associação Desportiva Confiança and was promoted to the senior team in 2011. On 28 August 2012, he was loaned to Botafogo PB for the 2013 campaign of Campeonato Paraibano. While at the club, he won the 2014 and 2015 seasons of Campeonato Sergipano besides achieving promotion to Série C in 2014.

Valdo joined Série B club Ceará in May 2016, after agreeing to a two-year deal. On 15 June 2016, he made his debut for the club, playing the whole ninety minutes of a 3–0 victory against Brasil de Pelotas.

On 25 January 2020, Valdo abroad to Japan and signed transfer to J1 club, Shimizu S-Pulse ahead for 2020 season. He debuted in J.League Cup against Kawasaki Frontale at away game in Matchweek 1 on 16 February at same year.

On 28 December 2022, Valdo announcement officially transfer to J2 club, V-Varen Nagasaki for upcoming 2023 season.

Personal life
Valdo's younger brother Anderson is also a footballer and a centre back. He was also groomed at Confiança.

Career statistics

Honours
Confiança
Campeonato Sergipano: 2014, 2015

Ceará
Campeonato Cearense: 2017, 2018

References

External links

Ceará Sporting Club profile 

1992 births
Living people
People from Aracaju
Brazilian footballers
Association football defenders
Campeonato Brasileiro Série A players
Campeonato Brasileiro Série B players
Campeonato Brasileiro Série C players
Campeonato Brasileiro Série D players
Associação Desportiva Confiança players
Botafogo Futebol Clube (PB) players
Araripina Futebol Clube players
Ceará Sporting Club players
Shimizu S-Pulse players
V-Varen Nagasaki players
J1 League players
J2 League players
Brazilian expatriate footballers
Expatriate footballers in Japan
Sportspeople from Sergipe